A State of Trance (often abbreviated as ASOT) is a Dutch trance radio show hosted by Armin van Buuren and co-producer Ruben de Ronde that first aired in June 2001. It is aired weekly every Thursday at 20:00 (CET) and 14:00 (EST). As of January 2021, ASOT is broadcast to more than 150 stations in 84 countries, and its listener count surpassed 40 million.

ASOT is broadcast as a 2-hour livestream with some stations re-airing the entire stream (including Honolulu's My 95.9, Barcelona's Europa FM, Russia's Radio Record, and Sirius XM channel Diplo's Revolution). However several of its radio affiliates (including Romania's Dance FM, Western Africa's Hit Radio, Brisbane's Radio Metro, and Sri Lanka's Yes101) omit the second hour, while stations (including New Zealand's Pulzar FM, Melbourne's 88.7 Kiss FM, and Argentina's Delta 90.3) format the show into two 58-minute segments to make time for local advertising and station branding.

Format and broadcasts 

The show usually takes the format of a two-hour mix in which the latest news in trance music (uplifting trance, vocal trance, and progressive trance), both promotional and commercially released, are presented, especially. Special episodes are also made.

The show has its own website, which enables fans to converse in chat rooms and forums while listening to the broadcast. The show is celebrated live each year in different locations around the globe with a lineup consisting of many trance artists.

Currently it is broadcast on websites such as DI.FM and by many radio stations around the world. It is also broadcast on YouTube, where the complete programs are officially uploaded (from episode 757 in audio and from episode 800 Part 2 in video), Twitch, Facebook and VK. Individual tracks from A State of Trance are available on a number of streaming services, including Spotify, iTunes, Deezer, Tidal and Anghami. Track lists for every episode can be found in the description of each YouTube stream, 1001tracklists.com, and the Episodes page of Armin van Buuren's A State of Trance website.

History

Background and growth 

On 1 June 2001 (a Friday), Episode 001 was broadcast through ID&T Radio, and it continued to be broadcast weekly. In the first three episodes, the show was called Into Trance. From Episode 004 onwards, it was called A State Of Trance.

Since episode 017, the show has aired on Thursdays.

Episode 182 was the last to air on ID&T Radio, as the show was canceled unexpectedly after the station decided to change its music policy. Episode 183 was aired a month later, through the Internet radio station ETN.fm. To better adapt to an international audience, Armin went from presenting in Dutch to presenting in English.

From Episode 185 onward, the show went from ETN.fm to DI.FM and began to synchronize on many national radio stations.

Since the 500th episode, 'A State of Trance's' annual episodic celebrations have effectively replaced Trance Energy (later simply called Energy, focusing on electro house instead of trance) as the main trance event in the Netherlands, where every year the biggest of these celebrations takes place.

From episode 800 Part 2, the show began to broadcast in video through YouTube from a new studio in Amsterdam. In addition, the Dutch DJ and producer Ruben de Ronde began to co-host the program with Armin van Buuren.

For most episodes beginning with episode 922 different DJs are invited to mix during parts of the show. Armin is absent from some episode occasionally and other DJs, such as Ferry Corsten, present those episodes.

In episode 972, Ferry Corsten's monthly residency on the show is announced.

Record label (2003–present) 
The label A State of Trance was formed in 2003 as a sub-label to its Dutch parent company Armada Music. The style of released music is mainly trance and progressive trance. The label is focusing on both young producers (such as Filo & Peri, 8 Wonders, Robert Nickson, and Galen Behr) as well as established artists (like Markus Schulz, Sunlounger, Sean Tyas, Signum and Vincent de Moor). It released its first vinyl release in 2003 with "Questia - Nexus Asia" and reached its 100th release (ASOT100) with "The Doppler Effect – Beauty Hides in the Deep / Envio – For You (The Blizzard Remix)" in June 2008.

The radio show's legacy 
While it was not the first radio show to broadcast a two-hour mix from a recurring DJ, A State of Trance's legacy has extended beyond the trance scene. Part of this may be due to the fact that, for most parts of the world, A State of Trance was only accessible via Digitally Imported (also known as DI.FM), an internet radio station. Since A State of Trance has been on the air, numerous DJs have created their own radio programs similar to A State of Trance; some of these include Above & Beyond's Group Therapy (formerly Trance Around the World), Aly & Fila's Future Sound of Egypt, and Markus Schulz's Global DJ Broadcast.

Special episodes and celebrating events 
Although the program usually takes the format of a mixture of two hours in which the latest musical developments are presented, special episodes are also made: broadcasts of recorded sessions, the programs in which the Tune of the Year is chosen, the Year Mix, the anniversary editions, as well as various specials.

The 100th episode was a 5-hour special show, with guest mixes and the best tunes of the 100 episodes.

The 200th episode was a 4-hour special show, with the most requested songs by listeners, a Gabriel & Dresden guest mix, and one hour of a live show from Amsterdam.

Since the 250th episode, and every subsequent 50th episode of the show, there are some celebrations that include guest trance DJs that play live. Since the 400th episode, these celebrations have often taken place in different countries.

In March 2011, during the Ultra Music Festival, A State of Trance was given its own stage as part of its A State of Trance 500 Tour. Since Ultra 2011, A State of Trance has had its own arena at Ultra and the Electric Daisy Carnival in Las Vegas.

Since the 500th episode, A State of Trance's annual episodic celebrations have effectively replaced Trance Energy (later simply called Energy, focusing on electro house instead of trance) as the main trance event in the Netherlands, where every year the biggest of these celebrations takes place.

Regular features 
Each regular broadcast features five songs selected as Tune of the Week, Future Favourite, Service for Dreamers, Trending Track and Progressive Pick.

The Tune of the Week is selected by Armin van Buuren as his personal choice of best new tune in the show.

The Future Favorite is voted for by listeners from a list of new tunes from the previous week's show. This section began in episode 090. The poll takes place at Future Favorite.

For Service for Dreamers, Armin asks the listeners of A State of Trance to submit original suggestions for a trance track that has had a meaningful impact in their lives. During episodes 248–769, when it was known as ASOT Radio Classic (and between episode 770 and 799 as Armin's Oldskool Classic), Armin would select a track from past years and briefly describe what made the track a classic. Armin also played a classic track on each of the first 16 episodes in the early days of the radio show. These tracks were productions from the 1990s and showcased some of the very earliest pioneers of the Trance genre.

The Trending Track is the most discussed track from last week's show. This section began in episode 706.

The Progressive Pick is a segment for a featured new progressive trance track. This segment began in episode 717.

Compilation series

A State Of Trance Series 
Armin van Buuren annually releases a double mix CD of A State Of Trance compilations, as listed below:

A State Of Trance Year Mix Series 
Armin van Buuren annually records so-called Year Mixes that comprises the crème de la crème of trance music from the previous year. Besides being broadcast and streamed, these are available in double mix CD format:

Awards and nominations

International Dance Music Awards

See also 
 Corsten's Countdown, a similar show by Ferry Corsten
 Future Sound of Egypt, a similar show by Aly & Fila
 Global DJ Broadcast, a similar show by Markus Schulz

References

External links 

 A State of Trance official site
 Armin van Buuren official site
 
 A State of Trance archive
 "Radio stations broadcasting A State of Trance"

Dutch music radio programs
2001 radio programme debuts
Electronic music radio shows
Trance music
Armin van Buuren